Rakista is a weekly Philippine television comedy/musical series that centers on the exploits of a newly formed rock band composed of five Filipino college students. It aired from August 14, 2008, to November 20, 2008, replacing PBA Classics and was replaced by Rescue Mission. The program aired every Thursday nights (with a rerun on Sunday afternoons) on TV5. It was among the new shows unveiled by the network (formerly known as ABC5) upon its relaunch on 9 August 2008.

Rakista TV Series was created by filmmaker Quark Henares and Diego Castillo, co-founder and guitarist of the rock band Sandwich. Apart from Henares and Castillo, writers for the show have included music video director King Palisoc, Palanca Award-winning author Yvette Tan and The Philippine Star columnist Erwin Romulo. Each episode also features a narration by poet and vocalist for Radioactive Sago Project Lourd de Veyra. Mikey Amistoso of Ciudad (band) and Diego Mapa of Cambio are credited with the original music for the series.

Synopsis
Rakista features a behind-the-scenes look at the on-campus and off-campus adventures of a struggling newly formed rock band named The Love Team. Its soundtrack is rock music-intensive, showcasing compositions from many Filipino bands. The story starts when Caloy (Carlo Aquino) practices his guitar and his brother, also a musician but a frustrated one, but no longer following his dream and told Caloy to do what his heart follows but make priorities first.

Cast

Critical reception
The TV series has been lauded uniquely "Pinoy" style and for its "twisted sense of humor that has never been present in [Philippine] television." Critics have attributed as among the show's influences, Joss Whedon, John Hughes films, The Adventures of Pete and Pete, and the Michael Winterbottom film 9 Songs.

References

External links
Rakista

2008 Philippine television series debuts
2008 Philippine television series endings
2000s teen sitcoms
Philippine comedy television series
TV5 (Philippine TV network) original programming
Philippine musical television series
Filipino-language television shows